The Dongbuk Line is a future subway line scheduled to open in June 2025, in Seoul, South Korea. Construction began in October 2019.

Stations

References 

Seoul Metropolitan Subway lines